Tom Dillon (6 July 1920 – 17 August 2007) was an Australian rules footballer who played with Carlton in the Victorian Football League (VFL).

Dillon served in the Australian Army during World War Two.

Notes

External links 

Tom Dillon's profile at Blueseum

1920 births
2007 deaths
Carlton Football Club players
Australian rules footballers from Victoria (Australia)